George Oluwaseun Bello (born January 22, 2002) is an American professional soccer player who plays as a left-back for 2. Bundesliga club Arminia Bielefeld and the United States national team.

Early years
Born in Abuja, Nigeria, Bello moved with his family to Douglasville, Georgia, when he was a year old. During his early career, he played for Southern Soccer Academy, a youth soccer club affiliated with English club Chelsea, and the Alpharetta Ambush, where he played for five years. While playing at Alpharetta Ambush, he played with future Atlanta United academy teammate Zyen Jones.

After spending five years with the Alpharetta Ambush, Bello moved to the academy side at Atlanta United FC, a new expansion club for Major League Soccer. His former coach, Tony Annan, now at Atlanta United as their academy director, was the one to reach out to Bello to join his side.

In 2017, a couple of months after signing a professional contract with Atlanta United FC, Bello helped Atlanta United's under-16 side win the U.S. Soccer Development Academy U16 Championship. His performance during the season saw him named 2016–17 East Conference U15/16 Player of the Year and also included in the East Conference U15/16 Best XI.

Club career

Atlanta United
On June 17, 2017, Bello, alongside teammates Lagos Kunga and Patrick Okonkwo, was signed by Atlanta United FC to a homegrown player contract which would start in 2018. He made his professional debut on March 31, 2018 for Atlanta United 2, the club's reserve team, against Charlotte Independence. He started and played the whole match in a 2–2 draw.

On September 2, 2018, Bello made his debut for the Atlanta United FC senior side in their Major League Soccer match against D.C. United. He came on as a 76th minute substitute for Héctor Villalba as Atlanta United FC were defeated 3–1. He scored his first professional goal a month later on October 6 against the New England Revolution. He scored his team's opening goal in the 17th minute of a 2–1 Atlanta United FC victory. During the 2018 MLS Playoffs, Bello featured for Atlanta United FC twice from the bench but did not play as Atlanta United FC won the 2018 MLS Cup.

The next season, Bello made his international club debut for Atlanta United FC in the CONCACAF Champions League against Herediano on February 21. He started as a left-wide back as Atlanta United FC were defeated 3–1. In May 2019, it was confirmed that he would miss two to three months of the season with an injury to his right adductor. Returning in August, Bello went on to only play 12 matches with Atlanta United 2 in the USL Championship and none with Atlanta United FC during the 2019 season.

Arminia Bielefeld
On January 31, 2022, Bello joined German Bundesliga side Arminia Bielefeld on a four-and-a-half year contract for an undisclosed fee.

International career
Bello has represented the United States at both the under-15 and under-17 level. He was part of the under-15 squad that won the Torneo Delle Nazioni in 2017. The United States won every match in which he started. On October 10, 2019, he was named in the under-17 squad for the FIFA U-17 World Cup.

In January 2021, Bello was called into the United States national team for their friendly against Trinidad and Tobago. He made his debut in the match on January 31, coming on as a 64th minute substitute in the 7–0 victory. On July 17, 2021, he was named by head coach Gregg Berhalter into the 23-man squad for the 2021 CONCACAF Gold Cup. He started in two matches for the United States as they made it into the final against Mexico. Bello was named as a starter for the match and played 65 minutes as the United States won 1–0 after extra-time.

Personal life
Bello is named after his grandfather, Georgie. His father was an amateur footballer in Nigeria and helped Bello develop his interest in the game. Bello also ran track and field in high school and helped his school win the 2016 Georgia team state championship. His favorite soccer players growing up were Neymar and Lionel Messi but he also was interested in the left back position and watched videos of David Alaba and Marcelo.

Career statistics

Club

International

Honors
Atlanta United
MLS Cup: 2018
U.S. Open Cup: 2019
Campeones Cup: 2019

United States
CONCACAF Gold Cup: 2021

Individual
MLS All-Star: 2021

References

External links
Profile at Atlanta United

2002 births
Living people
People from Abuja
People from Douglasville, Georgia
Soccer players from Georgia (U.S. state)
Sportspeople from the Atlanta metropolitan area
American soccer players
United States men's international soccer players
United States men's youth international soccer players
American expatriate soccer players in Germany
American expatriate soccer players
American sportspeople of Nigerian descent
Nigerian footballers
Nigerian emigrants to the United States
2021 CONCACAF Gold Cup players
Arminia Bielefeld players
Association football fullbacks
Atlanta United FC players
Atlanta United 2 players
Bundesliga players
CONCACAF Gold Cup-winning players
Homegrown Players (MLS)
Major League Soccer players
USL Championship players